North Marion High School is a public high school in West Virginia, United States. It is one of three high schools in Marion County, alongside Fairmont Senior High School and East Fairmont High School.

North Marion High School was completed and opened in September 1979. The school is classified as "AA", and it has an enrollment of 851 students as of 2020.

Athletics

In popular culture
The school is represented as "Grantville High School" in the popular alternative history novel 1632 by writer Eric Flint.  The novel is set in the fictional town of Grantville, which is based on the real town and surroundings of Mannington.

Notable alumni
Rich Rodriguez, 1981 graduate: Former West Virginia University football player and head coach; Former head football coach for the University of Michigan; Former Head Football coach at the University of Arizona. Current Offensive Coordinator at the University of Louisiana-Monroe.   
Natalie Tennant, 1986 graduate: First female to represent West Virginia University as the Mountaineer Mascot; Prominent television anchor and reporter, working in both the Clarksburg and Charleston television markets; Former WV Secretary of State, elected in 2008, serving from 2009-2017.

References 

Public high schools in West Virginia
Educational institutions established in 1979
Schools in Marion County, West Virginia
1979 establishments in West Virginia